Godfrey of Namur (attested in 1080; died 19 August 1139) was a Lotharingian nobleman. He was Count jure uxoris of Porcéan from 1097 until his death. From 1102, he was also Count of Namur. He was the oldest son of Count Albert III and his wife Ida of Saxony, the heiress of Laroche.

In 1121, he founded Floreffe Abbey, where he also was buried.

Marriages and issue 
Godfrey married twice.

He first married in 1087 Sibylle, a daughter of Count Roger of Château-Porcien and his wife Ermengarde. Together, they had two daughters:
 Elisabeth (fl. 1141), married Gervais, Count of Rethel and later Clarembaud de Roscy;
 Flandrine, married Hugh of Épinoy.
Sibylle and Godfrey divorced in 1105 because of her pregnancy by her lover Enguerrand I, Lord of Coucy.

In 1109, Godfrey married Ermesinde (d. 24 June 1143), the daughter of Count Conrad I of Luxembourg and his wife Clementia.  She was the widow of Count Albert I of Egisheim-Dagsburg and Moha. Together, they had the following children:
 Albert who died young (died about 1127)
 Henry the Blind (d. 14 August 1196). He was Count of Luxembourg from 1136 until his death, and Count of Namur, Laroche, Durbuy and Longwy from 1139 to 1189.  He was also advocatus of St. Maximin Abbey in Trier and St. Willibrord Abbey in Echternach.  He married:
 Lauretta of Flanders (married ; divorced 1163, died ).  She was a daughter of Thierry of Alsace, Count of Flanders and Margaret of Clermont.  She was the widow of Count Ivan of Aalst and of Ralph I, Count of Vermandois; she had divorced Henry II.
 in 1168 to Agnes, a daughter of Henry I, Count of Guelders
 Clementia (d. 28 December 1158), married in 1130 to Duke Conrad I of Zähringen
 Alice, married  to Baldwin IV
 Beatrix (d. 1160), married Ithier, Count of Rethel

Emperor Frederick Barbarossa decided that Ermesinde was the heir to the County of Luxembourg.  The county was transferred to her son, who became count of Luxembourg as Henry IV.

References

Sources

Counts of Namur
House of Namur
11th-century births
1139 deaths
11th-century people of the Holy Roman Empire
12th-century people of the Holy Roman Empire